This is a list of marching bands.  Major types include collegiate and military.  At least 16 U.S. colleges have had scramble bands, which are also included in this list.

North America

United States
 Macy's Great American Marching Band
 U.S. Army All-American Marching Band

Collegiate marching bands
This list excludes scramble bands.

Collegiate scramble bands
Brown University Band
University of Chicago Band
Columbia University Marching Band
Dartmouth College Marching Band
Harvard University Band
Humboldt State University Marching Lumberjacks
Huskies Pep Band
Lady Godiva Memorial Bnad
Marching Owl Band
The University of Pennsylvania Band
Princeton University Band
Stanford Band
Virginia Pep Band
William & Mary Pep Band 
Yale Precision Marching Band

Festivals
Collegiate Marching Band Festival

Canada
78th Highlanders (Halifax Citadel) Pipe Band
The Carnival Band (Canadian band)
Hamilton Police Pipe Band
Lady Godiva Memorial Band – scramble
Ceremonial Band of the Waterloo Regional Police
Royal Military College of Canada Bands – college
Simon Fraser University Pipe Band – college
Toronto Police Pipe Band
Western Mustang Band – college
Windsor Police Pipe Band – police
University of British Columbia Thunderbird Marching Band – college
Toronto Signals Band
Oshawa Civic Band
Calgary Round-Up Band
Calgary Stetson Show Band
Calgary Stampede Showband
Our Lady of the Rockies High School
Red Deer Royals Marching Showband

Europe

Austria
Guggenmusik

Great Britain
Royal Marines Band Service – military
Royal Corps of Army Music – military
RAF Pipe Bands Association – military
RAF Voluntary Bands – military
Royal Air Force Music Services – military
Cassino Band of Northumbria Army Cadet Force – military
Ambassadors Showband Derby - college
The Chesterfield Musketeers Showband – English
Christ's Hospital Band - college
Dagenham Girl Pipers – English
Derby Serenaders - show band
Distant Thunder – English
Hertfordshire Showband – English
Nexus Drum & Bugle Corps
The Pacemakers Drum and Bugle Corps
Romford Drum & Trumpet Corps – English
Royal British Legion Band & Corps Of Drums Romford – English
West of Scotland Band Alliance

Russia
Russian military bands
Brass Band of the Government of Tuva

Asia

Armenia 
Band of the General Staff of the Armed Forces of Armenia

Israel
Israel Defense Forces Orchestra
Israel Police Orchestra

Kazakhstan 
Presidential Orchestra of the State Security Service of the Republic of Kazakhstan
Central Military Band of the Ministry of Defense of Kazakhstan
Band of the National Guard of the Republic of Kazakhstan

Singapore
Singapore Armed Forces Band
Singapore Police Force Band
Saint Joseph's Institution Military Band
Singapore National Cadet Corps Command Band

Australasia

Australia
The Pipeband Club, Sydney
Australian Army Band Corps – military
The Lancer Band – military

New Zealand
Wellington Brass Band

See also

 Lists of musicians
 Marching bands
 March (music)
 Brass band
 Concert band
 Corps of Drums
 Drum and bugle corps
 Police band (music)

References

Sources
 Marching.com

Marching bands